Transition is a jazz album recorded by Buddy Rich and Lionel Hampton and released on the Groove Merchant Record label in 1974.

Track listing 
LP side A
"Avalon" (Al Jolson, Billy Rose) – 3:31
"Airmail Special" (Benny Goodman, Jimmy Mundy, Charlie Christian) – 6:07
"Ham Hock Blues" – 5:34 
"Ring dem Bells" (Duke Ellington, Irving Mills) – 4:15
LP side B
"E.G." – 8:24
"Fum" – 9:20

Personnel 
 Buddy Rich – drums
 Lionel Hampton – vibraphone 
 Teddy Wilson – piano (except "E.G." and "Fum")
 Zoot Sims – tenor saxophone (except "E.G.")
 George Duvivier – bass (except "E.G." and "Fum")
 Sal Nistico – tenor saxophone – (on "E.G." and "Fum") 
 Jack Wilkins – guitar (on "E.G." and "Fum")
 Kenny Barron – piano (on "E.G." and "Fum") 
 Joe Romano – soprano saxophone (on "E.G." and "Fum")
 Anthony Jackson – bass (on "E.G." and "Fum") 
 Bob Cranshaw – bass (on "E.G." and "Fum") 
 Stanley Kay – percussion (on "E.G." and "Fum")
 Ted Sommer – percussion (on "E.G." and "Fum")

References 

Groove Merchant GM 3302
Transition at discogs.com

1974 albums
Lionel Hampton albums
Buddy Rich albums
Albums produced by Sonny Lester
Groove Merchant albums